"I Can't Help It" is a song by English girl group Bananarama from their fourth studio album, Wow! (1987). It was released on 29 December 1987 as the album's third single, except in the United States, where it was the second single (following "I Heard a Rumour"), and Australia, where it served as the fourth single (after "I Want You Back"). The track was co-written and produced by the Stock Aitken Waterman (SAW) trio.

The single peaked at number 20 in the UK singles chart,  #27 on the Australian ARIA chart (where it was released in August 1988), and #47 on the U.S. Billboard Hot 100. A hit in nightclubs, "I Can't Help It" climbed to number seven on the U.S. Hot Dance Club Play chart, being their last hit in American charts.

This is the final Bananarama single to feature Siobhan Fahey, who announced her departure shortly after its release.

The photos on the record sleeve were taken by famous American photographer Herb Ritts. The record sleeves for "I Can't Help It" and "Love In The First Degree" were switched with each other for the UK and North American markets.

The song's extended mixes were the inspiration for former PWL staffer Pete Hammond's 2007 remix of Danish group Alphabeat's hit, "Boyfriend".

Critical reception
Max Bell from Number One wrote, "Always somehow around, Bananarama make each new day a thing to look forward to. There are two sorts of B'rama singles, good ones and very good ones and this is the latter variety from the most London group of all. Capital stuff. Excellent video."

Music video
The accompanying music video for the "I Can't Help It" features muscle men dancing, colourful backdrops, and Sara Dallin and Keren Woodward in a milk bath filled with fruit and naked men. Siobhan Fahey, who was pregnant at the time, also appears but was only shown on camera from the shoulders up. The video was directed by Andy Morahan.

Track listings

 7-inch single
"I Can't Help It" – 3:31
"Ecstasy" – 4:10

 UK limited-edition 7-inch single
"I Can't Help It" – 3:31
"Ecstasy" (Edit) – 2:00
"Love in the First Degree" – 3:29

 12-inch single
"I Can't Help It" (Extended Club Mix) – 8:03
"Ecstasy" (Chicago House Stylee) – 5:56

 12-inch single (remix)
"I Can't Help It" (The "Hammond Version" Excursion) – 6:24
"Ecstasy" (Wild Style) – 5:35

 German CD single
"I Can't Help It" (Extended Club Mix) – 8:09
"Ecstasy" (Chicago House Stylee) – 4:20
"Mr Sleaze" (Rare Groove Remix) – 6:04

 US 12-inch single and cassette
"I Can't Help It" (Remix) – 8:03
"I Can't Help It" (7″ Version) – 3:38
"Mr Sleaze" (Rare Groove Version) – 6:00
"Mr Sleaze" (Instrumental) – 4:09

 Canadian 12-inch single
"I Can't Help It" (Remix) – 8:03
"I Can't Help It" (7″ Version) – 3:38
"Mr Sleaze" (Rare Groove Mix) – 6:00

Personnel
Bananarama
 Sara Dallin – vocals
 Siobhan Fahey – vocals
 Keren Woodward – vocals

Additional personnel
 Andrew Biscomb – sleeve design
 Peter Barrett – sleeve design
 Herb Ritts – photography

Charts

References

Bananarama songs
1987 songs
1987 singles
London Records singles
Music videos directed by Andy Morahan
Songs written by Mike Stock (musician)
Songs written by Matt Aitken
Songs written by Sara Dallin
Songs written by Siobhan Fahey
Songs written by Keren Woodward
Songs written by Pete Waterman
Song recordings produced by Stock Aitken Waterman